The Daewoo Precision Industries K3 is a South Korean light machine-gun. It is the third indigenous firearm developed in South Korea by the Agency for Defense Development, following the Daewoo Precision Industries K1 submachine gun and Daewoo Precision Industries K2 assault rifle. It is manufactured by Daewoo Precision Industries, current S&T Motiv. The K3 is capable of firing both 5.56×45mm NATO and  Remington rounds like the K2 assault rifle. The K3 light machine gun entered service in 1989, replacing the M60 machine gun in frontline use.

Development

The K3 is a light machine gun resembling the FN Minimi and uses a standard 5.56×45mm NATO cartridge. Its greatest advantage is that it is lighter than the M60 and can interchange cartridges with both the K1A and K2. The feed can come from either a 30-round box magazine or a 200-round disintegrating M27 ammunition belt. It can be used with a bipod for the Squad Automatic role, and fitted with a tripod for sustained fire support.

The rear sight is adjustable for elevation and windage, and the foresight can be adjusted for elevation for zeroing. The barrel has a built-in carry handle for ease of changing the barrel. The gun is gas operated, with a rotating bolt.

The weapon system was not designed for customization, due to the fact that most soldiers of the South Korean military will not see extended use of their weapons.

By 2015, ROK forces were looking to obtain a new LMG, as the K3 was suffering from age and reliability issues. S&T Motiv is attempting to win the contract by modernizing the K3 with a side-folding adjustable stock, an integral MIL-STD-1913 rail on feed cover, detachable side and underside rails, a carbon fiber heat shield over barrel, an improved muzzle brake/flash hider, folding iron sights, and an upgraded feed system.

The same improvements would also be applied to the shorter "Para" version. As of 2019, it has not been adopted for general service, but it has been suggested that special forces units could use it.

K15
In late 2018, the S&T Motiv "Next-Generation LMG" was standardized as the K15, a heavily upgraded version of the K3 planned for fielding to the ROK Army by 2020. It has an adjustable buttstock and redesigned pistol grip/trigger group component for improved ergonomics, and internal parts are reconfigured and manufactured with closer tolerances for better reliability. Unlike the K3, it uses a push button to hold and release the barrel with three upper positioning lugs to ensure the barrel sits on a correct position when reattached. The feed cover and handguard have rails integrally attached, rather than needing an adapter to have them installed like the K3; this helps it to utilize a day/night fire control system that uses a thermal sight, laser rangefinder and ballistic computer. Each leg of the bipod operates independently to make for a more sturdy firing platform and the front sight is collapsible. The K15 is still fed from a 200-round plastic container and also can accept a STANAG magazine in emergency situations. Deliveries began in December 2022.

Foreign sales
One example of the K3 was purchased by South Africa in 2006, and two examples were purchased by Thailand in the same year. A controversy broke out 2007 in the Philippines when the country's Armed Forces initially selected the FN Minimi rather than picking the K3 or the 5.56 mm Ultimax from Singapore. The AFP's Modernization Program was attacked for showing favoritism towards a Western firearms company over Asian arms manufacturers.

Ultimately, 6,540 K3s were acquired by the Philippine Army for their SAW requirement. 5,883 units were first shown in public on February 18, 2008, together with 603 newly delivered Kia KM-450 trucks.

Variants
 XK3: Experimental prototype.
 K3: Standard mass-produced variant.
 K3Para: Shortened version of K3 with RAS and minor modifications. First revealed in 2015.
 K15: Heavily redesigned and modernized version.

Users

 : 400 K3s acquired in 2006.
 
 
 
 : 110 K3s acquired in 2006, and additional 803 in 2011.  
 : Standard squad automatic weapon. Planned to replace with K3 Para.
 : Philippine Army acquired 6,540 units in 2008.  K3s acquired by Philippine National Police in 2019.
 : 2 K3s transferred according to a 2019 SIPRI small arms report.

See also
 FN Minimi
 M249
 RPL-20
 QJS-161
 H&K MG4
 CETME Ameli
 Ultimax 100
 IMI Negev

References

Further reading

External links

 K1 through K7 images
 K3 image at Modern Firearms
 S&T Daewoo Homepage

Light machine guns
Machine guns of South Korea
Military equipment introduced in the 1990s